Southland Center can refer to:
Southland Center, a former name of Sheraton Dallas Hotel
Southland Center (Illinois), sports venue in Lynwood, Illinois
Southland Center (Michigan), a shopping center in Michigan
Westfield Southland, a retail complex in Cheltenham, Victoria, Australia

See also
Southland (disambiguation)